Kathering Waleska Jarquín Blandón (born 27 June 2000) is a Nicaraguan footballer who plays as a midfielder for UNAN Managua and the Nicaragua women's national team.

Club career
Jarquín has played for Leyendas FC and UNAN Managua in Nicaragua.

International career
Jarquín made her senior debut for Nicaragua on 8 April 2021 in a 2–0 friendly away win over El Salvador.

References 

2000 births
Living people
Nicaraguan women's footballers
Women's association football midfielders
Nicaragua women's international footballers